The 2016 Blancpain GT Series was the third season of the Blancpain GT Series. The season started on 10 April in Misano and ended on 2 October in Barcelona. The season featured ten rounds, five Endurance Cup rounds and five Sprint Cup rounds.

Calendar
On 18 September 2015, the Stéphane Ratel Organisation announced the 2016 calendar.

Race results
Bold indicates overall winner.

Championship standings
Scoring system
Championship points were awarded for the first six positions in each Qualifying Race and for the first ten positions in each Main Race. The pole-sitter in the Qualifying Race during Sprint Cup rounds and the pole-sitter during Endurance Cup rounds also received one point and entries were required to complete 75% of the winning car's race distance in order to be classified and earn points. Individual drivers were required to participate for a minimum of 25 minutes in order to earn championship points in any race.

Qualifying Race points

Main Race points

1000 km Paul Ricard points

24 Hours of Spa points
Points were awarded after six hours, after twelve hours and at the finish.

Drivers' championships

Overall
(key) Bold – Pole position Italics – Fastest lap

Pro-Am Cup

Am Cup

Teams' championships

Overall

Pro-Am Cup

Am Cup

See also
2016 Blancpain GT Series Endurance Cup
2016 Blancpain GT Series Sprint Cup

Notes

References

External links

 
GT World Challenge Europe
2016 in motorsport